Mashed is a vehicular combat racing video game developed by Supersonic Software. The game was originally released in Europe for PlayStation 2, Xbox and Microsoft Windows in June 2004. An updated version with additional features, titled Mashed: Fully Loaded in Europe and Drive to Survive internationally, was released in Europe in March 2005 and in North America in December 2006. The direct sequel Wrecked: Revenge Revisited was released in 2012.

While the game allows four-player multiplayer, the PlayStation 2 only natively supported two controllers. Since the game used so few buttons, the PlayStation 2 version uniquely allows two people to share a controller - one player would use the D-pad and the left stick, the other would use the colored buttons and the right stick. The game supports the PS2 multi tap for four players.

Reception

Mashed received "mixed or average reviews" on all platforms except the PlayStation 2 version of the Fully Loaded edition, which received "generally favourable reviews", according to the review aggregation website Metacritic. Andy Young of VideoGamer.com called the Xbox version "a great multiplayer game. One of the best in recent memory". Some American publications gave the game a review over a month after the Fully Loaded edition was released in Europe, but nearly two years before it was released in North America. In Japan, where the PS2 version of the Fully Loaded edition was ported under the name  and published by D3 Publisher on 15 December 2005, Famitsu gave it a score of two sixes, one five, and one four for a total of 21 out of 40.

References

External links

Supersonic Software Ltd Mashed: Drive to Survive page
Xplosiv Mashed: Drive to Survive PC page
Xplosiv Mashed Fully Loaded page
D3 Publisher page

2004 video games
Multiplayer and single-player video games
PlayStation 2 games
Racing video games
Vehicular combat games
Video games developed in the United Kingdom
Windows games
Xbox games
Empire Interactive games
Supersonic Software games
RenderWare games